Wedgwood Peak is a  mountain summit located in Mount Assiniboine Provincial Park, in the Canadian Rockies of British Columbia, Canada. Its nearest higher peak is Mount Assiniboine,  to the south.


History
The first ascent of Wedgwood Peak was made in 1910 by Katherine Longstaff and her brother Dr. Tom George Longstaff, with Rudolph Aemmer as their guide.

The mountain was named in 1918 by Katherine Longstaff Wedgwood for Arthur Felix Wedgwood (1877–1917), her late husband who was killed in World War I. Arthur Felix Wedgwood was also a fifth-generation descendant of Josiah Wedgwood.

First recognized as Mount Wedgwood in 1924, the mountain's present name Wedgwood Peak became official on March 31, 1966 when approved by the Geographical Names Board of Canada.

Geology
Wedgwood Peak is composed of sedimentary rock laid down during the Cambrian period. Formed in shallow seas, this sedimentary rock was pushed east and over the top of younger rock during the Laramide orogeny.

Climate
Based on the Köppen climate classification, Wedgwood Peak is located in a subarctic climate zone with cold, snowy winters, and mild summers. Temperatures can drop below −20 °C with wind chill factors below −30 °C. Precipitation runoff from Wedgwood Peak drains west into Wedgwood Creek which is a tributary of the Mitchell River, or east into Lake Magog .

See also

 Geography of British Columbia
 Geology of British Columbia

References

External links
Mount Assiniboine Provincial Park
 Weather: Wedgwood Peak

Three-thousanders of British Columbia
Canadian Rockies